Aubrevillea is a genus of flowering plants in the family Fabaceae. It belongs to the mimosoid clade of the subfamily Caesalpinioideae.

References

External links 

Mimosoids
Fabaceae genera
Taxa named by François Pellegrin